Cilia and flagella associated protein 53 is a protein that in humans is encoded by the CFAP53 gene.

Function

This gene belongs to the CFAP53 family. It was found to be differentially expressed by the ciliated cells of frog epidermis and in skin fibroblasts from human. Mutations in this gene are associated with visceral heterotaxy-6, which implicates this gene in determination of left-right asymmetric patterning.

References

External links

Further reading